John Huston Finley (October 19, 1863 – March 7, 1940) was Professor of Polities at Princeton University from 1900 to 1903, and President of the City College of New York from 1903 until 1913, when he was appointed President of the University of the State of New York and Commissioner of Education of the State of New York. A promenade along the western bank of the East River between 63rd Street and 125th Street in Manhattan was named the John Finley Walk in 1940 because he had often walked the perimeter of Manhattan.

Biography
He was born on October 19, 1863 in Grand Ridge, Illinois, the oldest son of James Gibson Finley and Lydia Margaret McCombs. His father and mother went out as early settlers on the prairies from the East. His father was the great-grandson of the Reverend James Finley, the first minister, it is believed, to settle permanently beyond the Allegheny Mountains in Western Pennsylvania, and brother of Dr. Samuel Finley, President of the College of New Jersey (now Princeton University) in the middle of the eighteenth century. Mr. Finley’s brother, Robert, who died in his early thirties, was associate editor of the Review of Reviews; his sister, Bertha, died as a missionary in Korea.

Finley was educated in the public schools of Grand Ridge, Ottawa Township High School, and Knox College, Galesburg, Illinois, receiving the degree of A.B. and A.M., and afterward took up post-graduate work at the Johns Hopkins University. He was valedictorian of his class at Knox and won the interstate prize in oratory in 1887. He was made an honorary member of the Northwestern chapter of Phi Beta Kappa. He was Secretary of the Illinois State Charities Aid Association, 1889–1892, and President of Knox College, 1892-1899. In the latter year, he went to New York, but after a year in the editorial departments of the publishing houses of Harpers and McClure's, returned to educational work, upon an invitation to take a newly established chair at Princeton University. He was Professor of Polities at Princeton from 1900–1903, and President of the College of the City of New York from 1903 until 1913, when he was appointed President of the University of the State of New York and Commissioner of Education of the State of New York. He was also Harvard University exchange lecturer on the Hyde Foundation at the Sorbonne in Paris from 1910 to 1911. During World War I he headed the Red Cross Commission in Palestine.

Finley was appointed The New York Times associate editor in 1921. On April 21, 1937, The Times announced Dr. Finley's appointment as editor-in-chief. He held that position until Nov. 16, 1938, when because of poor health he took the title of editor emeritus.  Finley was president of the American Geographical Society from 1925 to 1934. He remained an honorary president there until  his death. His position on the Times placed him in contact with the great explorers and fliers of the day, who signed their names for him on a terrestrial globe, which he presented to the Society in 1929. He also served on the board of trustees for Science Service, now known as Society for Science & the Public, from 1925-1940.

John H. Finley died while sleeping of a coronary embolism the morning of March 7, 1940 in New York City.

Legacy
During his long and distinguished career he received honorary degrees from over thirty colleges and universities, and twelve governments bestowed thirteen decorations on him.  In 1939 he was awarded Honorary Membership in the American Library Association.

References

External links

 
 
 

 

American newspaper editors
The New York Times editors
1863 births
1940 deaths
Knox College (Illinois) alumni
Johns Hopkins University alumni
Princeton University faculty
Presidents of City College of New York
State University of New York people
Harvard University staff
Academic staff of the University of Paris
Burials at Princeton Cemetery
Commissioners of Education of the State of New York
People from LaSalle, Illinois
Journalists from Illinois
American Geographical Society
Members of the American Academy of Arts and Letters